101st Brigade may refer to:

101st Brigade (United Kingdom), 1915 to 1919
101st Logistic Brigade of the British Army, formed in 1999
101st Brigade for the Protection of the General Staff of the Ukrainian Army
101st Territorial Defense Brigade (Ukraine)
101st Sustainment Brigade, of the United States Army
 101st Panzer Brigade of the Wehrmacht

See also
 101st Division
 101st Regiment
 101st Battalion
 101st Squadron

sl:Seznam brigad po zaporednih številkah (100. - 149.)#101. brigada